Kevin Hearne is an American urban fantasy novelist born and raised in Arizona.

Hearne is the author of nine novels published by Del Rey. These include the fantasy book series, The Iron Druid Chronicles and the 2015 Star Wars novel, Heir to the Jedi. His novel Tricked made the New York Times Best Seller list. His novel Shattered was his first work released in hardcover and was on the USA Today best sellers list.

Hearne was a high school English teacher at Desert Ridge High School in Mesa, Arizona before moving to Colorado with his wife and son. He is a graduate of Northern Arizona University.

In 2022, Hearne became a Canadian citizen.

Bibliography

Iron Druid Chronicles Universe

Novels
 Hounded (Del Rey, May 2011)
 Hexed (Del Rey, June 2011)
 Hammered (Del Rey, July 2011)
 Tricked (Del Rey, April 2012)
 Trapped (Del Rey, November 2012)
 Hunted (Del Rey, June 2013)
 Shattered (Del Rey, June 2014) [First hardcover release]
 Staked (Del Rey, January 2016)
 Scourged (Del Rey, April 2018) [Final novel]
Ink and Sigil (2020) [Note - set in the Iron Druid universe but not part of the Iron Druid series]
Paper and Blood (2021) [Note - set in the Iron Druid universe but not part of the Iron Druid series]

Collection
 Besieged (Del Rey, July 2017)

Oberon's Meaty Mysteries
 The Purloined Poodle (Subterranean, September 2016)
 The Squirrel on the Train (Subterranean, 2017)
 The Buzz Kill (Subterranean, in Death and Honey February 28, 2019)[9]

Novellas and short stories
 Clan Rathskeller (included with the Hounded e-book) (May 2011)
 Kaibab Unbound (included with the Hounded e-book) (May 2011)
 A Test of Mettle (on website and included with the Hammered e-book) (July 2011)
 Two Raven and One Crow (e-book and included in Hunted e-book and print) (September 2012)
 The Grimoire of the Lamb (e-book) (May 2013)
 The Chapel Perilous (in Unfettered) (June 2013)
 The Demon Barker of Wheat Street (in Carniepunk and Besieged) (July 2013)
 Goddess at the Crossroads (in A Fantasy Medley and Besieged) (2015)
 A Prelude to War (in Three Slices) (May 2015)
 The Eye of Horus (in Besieged) (July 2017)
 Gold Dust Druid (in Besieged) (July 2017)
 The Bogeyman of Boora Bog (in Besieged) (July 2017)
 Cuddle Dungeon (in Besieged) (July 2017)
 Blood Pudding (in Besieged) (July 2017)
 Haunted Devils (in Besieged) (July 2017)
 The End of Idylls (in Besieged) (July 2017)
 The Waters (Broad Reach Publishing, in Resist: Tales From A Future Worth Fighting Against, with half of proceeds going to the ACLU) (November 1, 2018) [11]

The Seven Kennings
A Plague of Giants (Del Rey, October 2017)
A Blight of Blackwings (Del Rey, February 2020)
A Curse of Krakens (expected June 8,2023)

Tales of Pell (with Delilah S. Dawson)
 Kill the Farm Boy (Del Rey, July 17, 2018)
 No Country for Old Gnomes (Del Rey, April 16, 2019) [10]
 The Princess Beard (Del Rey, October, 2019)

Other novels
 Star Wars: Heir to the Jedi (Del Rey, March 2015)

References

External links
Official website

 Fantastic Fiction Author Page
 

21st-century American novelists
Urban fantasy writers
Novelists from Arizona
Northern Arizona University alumni
American male novelists
Living people
21st-century American male writers
1970 births